Neobernaya spadicea, common name the chestnut cowrie, is a species of sea snail in the cowrie family, Cypraeidae. Chestnut cowries can be found in the eastern Pacific Ocean, from central California to Baja California. The chestnut cowrie has a highly glossy shell due to an enamel that is secreted from its mantle.

Distribution and habitat
The chestnut cowrie is the only species of cowrie in the eastern Pacific Ocean. It can be found in intertidal zones from Monterey, California to Isla Cedros, Baja California. It is common in Southern California, specifically around the Channel Islands. Chestnut cowries are rare in the portion of their range that is north of Santa Barbara, California.

Chestnut cowries live in kelp beds and rocky surfaces in intertidal and subtidal zones, to a depth of 45 m. Chestnut cowries are often found under rocks and protected crevices.

Description
The top of the shell displays a large irregularly shaped caramel colored spot, with a dark brown border. The rest of the shell is white, including the bottom. There is a narrow aperture with small teeth that spans the length of the underside of the shell. The shell can grow until the cowrie reaches its adult form, then it stops. When undisturbed, their orange spotted mantle extends around the outside of the shell; when fully extended it can completely cover the shell. The shell is glossy due to an enamel that is secreted from the edges of the mantle. Retracting and extending the mantle acts as a buffer, shining the shell while depositing new enamel. The foot of this species is white. The adult shell of this species ranges in size from 40 to 65 mm.

Ecology

Diet 
The chestnut cowrie is a scavenger and carnivore; common food items include anemones, sponges, tunicates, eggs, and dead organisms.

Reproduction 
Chestnut cowries lay batches of eggs during the summer months. Each batch consists of approximately 100 egg capsules with each egg capsule containing several hundred eggs.

References

Cypraeidae
Gastropods described in 1823